Abu'l-Khattab Muslim ibn Muhriz ( – died ), also called Salm and Abdallah, was a well-known musician and singer of Mecca in Arabia. Of Persian origin, Ibn Muhriz was a freedman (mawla) of the Banu Abd al-Dar or Banu Makhzum. His father was one of the gatekeepers of the Ka'ba. Ibn Muhriz first studied under Ibn Misdjah and then under Azza al-Mayla. He completed musical education in Iran and Syria. Ibn Muhriz suffered from leprosy, and therefore refrained from appearing much in public. He appears to have been content to have his compositions performed by a slave girl musician. Due to his clinical condition, Ibn Muhriz may have never attended the Umayyad court at Damascus, although a passage written by the 10th-century historian al-Masudi might imply that he was a musician in the retinue of Caliph Al-Walid II (743–744).

References

Sources
 
 

7th-century Iranian people
8th-century Iranian people
People from Mecca
Iranian musicians
Iranian male singers
Year of birth unknown
757 deaths
7th-century people from the Umayyad Caliphate
8th-century people from the Umayyad Caliphate
7th-century musicians
8th-century musicians
Medieval Arabic singers